The Montenegro Sailing Federation is the national governing body for the sport of sailing in Montenegro, recognised by the International Sailing Federation.

Famous Sailors
See :Category:Montenegrin sailors

Olympic sailing
See :Category:Olympic sailors of Montenegro

Yacht Clubs
See :Category:Yacht clubs in Montenegro

References

External links
 Official website

Montenegro
Sailing
Sailing
1947 establishments in Montenegro